Speed Walton is an American hip hop artist based in Cincinnati, Ohio. Speed gained recognition while using his previous stage name Buggs Tha Rocka During that time he released various underground  mix-tapes and projects.

Career 
In 2009 Speed released Hip Hop Super Hero in collaboration with DJ Mick Boogie. Speed gained a social media presence and created a fan base which he refers to as “Space Invadaz.” In 2010 he released” Mutant Level 5. The project featured  Little Brother, Freeway, Tanya Morgan and others.

In 2011 Speed formed the band Gold Shoes. The band consisted of a diverse group of musicians mostly drawn from Cincinnati. Due to the groups diversity, a influences in the music include jazz, classical, and funk. During this time he also performed solo hip-hop and teamed up with friend and Cincinnati native DJ Clock Work. Together they released the mix-tape Wrath of Zeus which assisted in winning a City Beat Cincinnati Entertainment Award (CEA) in 2012.

In 2014 he won another Cincinnati Entertainment Award for the release of the project “Scattered thoughts of an American poet”. During that year he was also invited by Talib Kweli to join his Prisoner of Conscious tour. In 2016 Speed signed with Talib’s Javotti Media along with fellow Cincinnati hip-hop -artist Donte of MOOD as the Space Invadaz.

Speed is currently working on projects with Capitol Records and touring on the Talib Kweli Radio Silence tour.

Early life 
Speed was born in Cincinnati and was brought up in the neighborhood of Corryville. He lived  with his grandmother, whom he referred to as "Big Momma", his older brother Jeremy, his mother Tanya, his aunt and five [cousins. Speed had a strong relationship with his grandmother who played a critical role in introducing him to music.

Speed’s mother soon relocated to a troubled Cincinnati neighborhood called Northside with his younger brother Noel. He attended Kirby, Schwab, and Chase schools where he earned the nickname Buggs. He would later go on to Aiken High School and collaborate with his friends and classmates Charles Beataholic Reynolds  (music producer), Fredrick Mango (A&R), Tawon Arnold (Hip-Hop Artist), and Herm .

Personal life 
Speed credits the music venues Bogart's and Sudsy Malones of Cincinnati as some of childhood musical influences. Speed is a member of the Moorish Science Temple. He is of Moorish descent.

Discography 
 Hip Hop Supa Hero 2009
 Mutant Level 5 2010
 Wrath of Zeus  2012
 Lost Luggage  2013
 Scattered Thoughts of an American Poet 2014
 Contact Space Invadaz 2016

Awards 
 Cincinnati Entertainment Award Hip Hop 2012-13 (Won) 
 Cincinnati Entertainment Award  Hip Hop 2014 (Won)
 Cincinnati Entertainment Award Hip Hop 2015 (Won)
 Cincinnati Entertainment Award Hip Hop 2016 (Won)
 Cincinnati Entertainment Award Hip Hop 2017 (Won)

References 



Living people
Year of birth missing (living people)
Rappers from Cincinnati